Spectral is a 2016 military science fiction film.

Spectral may also refer to:
 Spectral (Dave Rempis album)
 Spectral (Skyfire album)
 Spectral (Robin Schlochtermeier album)
 Spectral (computer), an East-German clone of the ZX Spectrum
 Spectral (app) IM client for the Matrix protocol
 Spectral theory, a family of mathematical theories extending the eigenvector and eigenvalue theory of a single square matrix to more generic operators
 Spectral method, a class of techniques to numerically solve certain differential equations, potentially involving the use of the Fast Fourier Transform
 Spectral analysis (disambiguation)

See also
 Spectrum (disambiguation)